Alesha Widdall (born January 3, 1990) is an American woman Field hockey player. She hails from Whitney Point, New York and played as a goalkeeper. She was part of the United States women's national field hockey team at the 2016 Summer Olympics. She retired from the national team in 2018.

References

External links
 
 
 

1990 births
Living people
American female field hockey players
Female field hockey goalkeepers
Olympic field hockey players of the United States
Field hockey players at the 2016 Summer Olympics
21st-century American women